Alena Leuchanka (born April 30, 1983) is a Belarusian professional women's basketball player who plays for Panathinaikos.

Biography 
Prior to joining the Dream for their inaugural 2008 season, Leuchanka was a member of the Charlotte Sting in 2006 and Washington Mystics in 2007. She began her college career at Seminole Junior College. She also attended West Virginia University after transferring from Wabash Valley Junior College.

During the seasons 2011-12 and 2012-13 she was a member of the Atlanta Dream of the WNBA in the United States and UMMC Ekaterinburg in the Russian Superleague.

On September 30, 2020 Leuchanka was arrested at the Minsk National Airport. She was sentenced to 15 days of arrest for her participation in the 2020 Belarusian protests against the rule of president Alexander Lukashenko. She was re-arrested immediately after her release on the 15th of October, for unclear reasons.

West Virginia statistics

National team
A member of the Belarus women's national basketball team, Leuchanka competed at the 2008 Summer Olympics for her country after leading the squad at the Olympic Qualifying Tournament in June 2008. She also competed at EuroBasket Women 2007 and EuroBasket Women 2009 for Belarus.

References

1983 births
Living people
Atlanta Dream players
Basketball players at the 2008 Summer Olympics
Basketball players at the 2016 Summer Olympics
Belarusian expatriate basketball people in Poland
Belarusian expatriate basketball people in Russia
Belarusian expatriate basketball people in Turkey
Belarusian women's basketball players
Centers (basketball)
Charlotte Sting players
Belarusian expatriate basketball people in the United States
Galatasaray S.K. (women's basketball) players
Guangdong Vermilion Birds players
Jiangsu Phoenix players
Liaoning Flying Eagles players
Olympic basketball players of Belarus
Panathinaikos WBC players
Seminole State College of Florida alumni
Sportspeople from Gomel
Undrafted Women's National Basketball Association players
Wabash Valley Warriors women's basketball players
Washington Mystics players